Yahaya Adamu (born July 17, 1993) is a Nigerian footballer. He was born in Kaduna, and currently plays for Naft Al-Janoob SC, which competes in the Iraqi Premier League, the top division in Iraq. He plays as a striker for Naft Al-Janoob SC

Honours 
COMPETITIONS PLAYED AND HONOURS
1. National under 15 Ramat cup 2007: gold medalist.
2. All Nigeria command games 2008(football) gold medal. (Most valuable
player)
3. National under 16 football tournament (Kontagora 2008) highest goal scorer
{6 goals}.
4. All Nigeria colleges of health games (Makarfi 2009) highest goal scorer (8
goals).
5. Youth sports federation of Nigeria (Ysfon) Adegbile cup
2009. (Silver medalist/highest goal scorer with 7goals).
6. Kaduna league 2010: highest goal scorer with 16 goals.
7. Senate president competition (Otukpo 2011): highest goal scorer 7 goals
National under 20 team invitee 2010 under coach John Obuh.
Currently with the National under 20 football team
Matches played
1. Tanzania vs Nigeria in Dar salaam
2. Nigeria vs Tanzania in Ilorin – Nigeria
3. Rwanda vs Nigeria in Kigali
4. Benin vs Nigeria in Cotonou
5. South Africa vs Nigeria in Nilsprin
6. Nigeria vs South Africa in Ilorin
7. Nigeria vs Benin in Abuja.
8. Egypt vs Nigeria in Cairo

External links
 YouTube Channel

References

1993 births
Living people
Nigerian footballers
Amanat Baghdad players
Naft Al-Basra SC players
Expatriate footballers in Iraq
Nigerian expatriate footballers
Nigerian expatriates in Iraq
Expatriate footballers in Vietnam
Association football forwards
People from Borno State